Milton S. Florsheim (July 27, 1868 – December 22, 1936), was the chairman of the board and founder of Florsheim Shoes.

Biography
Florsheim was born to a Jewish family in Montreal, Canada on July 27, 1868, the son of Henriette (nee Nusbaum) and Sigmund Florsheim. Shortly before he started grade school, the Florsheim family relocated to the Chicago area. He attended Chicago public schools. He worked in his father's shoe store before founding Florsheim Shoes in 1892. Florsheim was connected with the American Jewish Committee and the Jewish Charities of Chicago and was a trustee of Northwestern University.

In 1894, he married Gertrude Stern; they had two sons, Irving S. and Harold Milton (1900-1987). Harold was married to artist Claire Block Florsheim Zeisler. Irving's daughter Nancy married architect Bertrand Goldberg; and Irving's daughter Mary Florsheim Picking, was married to actor Allan Jones.

Florsheim died on December 22, 1936 at Los Angeles, California.

References

1868 births
1936 deaths
Businesspeople from Chicago
Businesspeople from Montreal
American Jews
Florsheim family